Equisetum variegatum, commonly known as variegated horsetail or variegated scouring rush, is a species of vascular plant in the horsetail family Equisetaceae. It is native to the Northern Hemisphere where it has a circumpolar distribution.

Description
It is a variable species with several ecotypes, some of which are distinct subspecies. The stems can grow to 40 cm (occasionally 80 cm) in height but are often much smaller. Some forms have prostrate stems that creep along the ground while other forms grow more erect. The stems are dark blue-green, slender and rough to the touch. They may be unbranched or have branches growing from the base. The stem nodes are covered with a sheath that is marked with a black band and has dark teeth with white edges. The stems are tipped with a small cone, 3–4 mm across, which is usually green with a black, bluntly-pointed tip.

Distribution and habitat
It has a circumpolar distribution in the northern hemisphere, where it is occurs in northern Europe, Asia and North America including Greenland, Iceland and the Faroe Islands. Its range extends south as far as the Pyrenees and Apennines in Europe, Mongolia and Japan in Asia and Connecticut, Wisconsin and Oregon in North America.

It prefers open, lime-rich sites, often those that flood in winter. It occurs in dune slacks, mountain flushes and beside lakes, rivers and canals.

References

Flora of North America. Equisetum variegatum. Accessed 30 July 2008.
Hutchinson, G. (1996) Welsh Ferns, National Museums and Galleries of Wales.
Page C. N. (1982) The Ferns of Britain and Ireland, Cambridge University Press.
Preston, C. D. & Pearman, D. A. (2002) New Atlas of the British and Irish Flora, Oxford University Press.
Tutin, T. G. et al. (1964) Flora Europaea, Volume 1. Cambridge University Press.

variegatum
Flora of Saint Pierre and Miquelon
Flora of England